Mauricio Pertierra (born 14 March 2003) is an Argentine professional footballer who plays as a midfielder for Alvarado.

Career
Pertierra joined Alvarado from El Gran Porvenir de San Clemente del Tuyú in early 2020, aged sixteen. He was promoted into Walter Coyette's first-team squad towards the back end of the year, initially featuring in friendlies; including against Círculo Deportivo on 7 November. After going unused on the bench for a 5–2 win away to Nueva Chicago in Primera B Nacional on 5 December, Pertierra was selected to start a home league defeat to Barracas Central on 19 December; aged seventeen.

Career statistics
.

References

External links

2003 births
Living people
Sportspeople from Buenos Aires Province
Argentine footballers
Association football midfielders
Primera Nacional players
Club Atlético Alvarado players